Maria Dmitriyevna Dobrova (1907-1962) was a Soviet military intelligence officer, Captain of the Soviet Army, and GRU officer, working illegally in the United States.

Maria Dobrova was born in Minsk, Belarus in 1907. She worked as a translator for the Soviet military advisers during the Spanish Civil War of 1936 to 1939.

She worked as a nurse at the hospital during World War II in Leningrad.

Dobrova was working by referent in the Soviet Embassy in Colombia from 1946 to 1950.

In 1951 she was invited to work in the Main Intelligence Directorate of Soviet Army (GRU).

After special training, she went by the name of Glen Morrero Podtseski in the United States in May 1954. In New York City, she opened her fitness facilities. In a short time the salon become a very respectable institution. Her beauty salon in New York was visited by wives of American politicians and businessmen.

During her stay in the U.S., she recruited several agents. Her GRU handler Dmitri Polyakov, who was posted in New York and secretly worked for the FBI, passed information about her to FBI agents in June 1962. When FBI agents entered her hotel room in Chicago, Maria refused to surrender and jumped from the balcony of the hotel in June 1962.

For 26 years, Soviet authorities knew nothing about her fate, until after the arrest of Polyakov in Moscow in July 1986.

References

External links
ШПИОН, ЗА КОТОРЫМ ОХОТИЛИСЬ ЧЕТВЕРТЬ ВЕКА
ДОБРОВА Мария Дмитриевна (псевд. Глен Морреро, Подцески, Мэйси, Кристина, Кристи)

1907 births
1962 suicides
Saint Petersburg State University alumni
GRU officers
Soviet Cold War spymasters
Soviet spies against the United States
Soviet people of the Spanish Civil War
Suicides by jumping in the United States
Women in the Spanish Civil War
Female wartime spies